Viktor Sokol (born 9 May 1981) is a retired Belarusian footballer. His father, who is also named Viktor Sokol was also a professional footballer from late 70s to early 90s.

Honours
Dinamo Minsk
 Belarusian Premier League champion: 2004
 Belarusian Cup winner: 2002–03

Dinamo Brest
 Belarusian Cup winner: 2006–07

External links
 
 

1981 births
Living people
Belarusian footballers
FC Dinamo Minsk players
FC Dynamo Brest players
Belarusian expatriate footballers
Expatriate footballers in Sweden
Enköpings SK players
FC Vitebsk players
FC Shakhtyor Soligorsk players
FC RUOR Minsk players
FC Dinamo-Juni Minsk players
FC Kobrin players
FC Isloch Minsk Raion players
Association football midfielders
Footballers from Minsk